Patrick Francis Carroll (born 17 August 1961) is an Australian former long-distance runner.

A Brisbane-based runner, Carroll won the Australian cross country championships in 1991, was a four-time winner of the Gold Coast Marathon and twice won the Sydney Morning Herald Half Marathon.

Carroll claimed a silver medal at the 1993 World Half Marathon Championships for the team competition.

In 1995, Carroll  ran a personal best time of 2:09:39 to win the Beppu-Ōita Marathon, becoming the fourth Australian to register a sub 2:10 time. He beat a field which included reigning Olympic bronze medalist Stephan Freigang.

Carroll competed in three editions of the Commonwealth Games, placing eighth in the 5,000 metres in 1990, fifth in the marathon in 1994 and seventh in the marathon in 1998.

References

External links
Pat Carroll at World Athletics

1961 births
Living people
Athletes from Brisbane
Australian male marathon runners
Australian male long-distance runners
World Athletics Championships athletes for Australia
Commonwealth Games competitors for Australia
Athletes (track and field) at the 1990 Commonwealth Games
Athletes (track and field) at the 1994 Commonwealth Games
Athletes (track and field) at the 1998 Commonwealth Games